The Paso Internacional Los Libertadores, also called Cristo Redentor, is a mountain pass in the Andes between Argentina and Chile. It is the main transport route out of the Chilean capital city Santiago into Mendoza city in Argentina and so carries quite heavy traffic.

Overview
From the Argentine side the route to the pass is a slow, gentle incline until entering a tunnel at approximately  elevation. On the Chilean side the slope has a far higher grade, and the road descends down a long series of switchbacks to make the descent.

At the middle of the tunnel is the national border, which is the termini of Chile Route 60 and Argentina Route 7. The path can be closed during winter because of heavy snows blocking both ends and the threat of rockfall.

On 19 September 2013, nearly 15,000 Chileans got stranded on the Argentine side, when the pass had to be closed for 10 hours because of freezing temperatures and between 40 and 50 centimeters of snow.

Alternative proposed tunnels
In order to ease the dependence on the only tunnel in the area and to permit year-round crossing, two lower tunnels have been proposed.

The Aconcagua Bi-Oceanic railway is a proposal for a  railway base tunnel under this pass.

See also
 Transandine Railway

References

External links

Official site of Cristo Redentor by Argentine National Gendarmerie
Tunnels in Argentina
Cristo Redentor Statue
Updated state of different tunnels and crossings in Argentina
Paso Las Leñas at UTN Facultad de San Rafael, Mendoza.

Argentina–Chile border crossings
Landforms of Mendoza Province
Landforms of Valparaíso Region
Mountain passes of Chile
Mountain passes of Argentina
Mountain passes of the Andes
Tunnels in Chile
Tunnels in Argentina
Tunnels completed in 1980
Principal Cordillera
Road tunnels
1980 establishments in Argentina
1980 establishments in Chile
de:Túnel del Cristo Redentor
pl:Tunel Chrystusa Zbawiciela